Pichot is a surname. Notable people with the surname include:

Agustín Pichot (born 1974), Argentine rugby union player
Alan Pichot (born 1998), Argentine chess grandmaster
Alexandre Pichot (born 1983), French cyclist
Amédée Pichot (1795–1877), French historian and translator
André Pichot (born 1950), French academic
Malena Pichot (born 1982), Argentine stand-up comedian
Matthieu Pichot (born 1989), French footballer
Ramon Pichot (1871–1925), Catalan artist
Stéphane Pichot (born 1976), French association football player

See also
Sophie Moressée-Pichot (born 1962), French fencer